Herbert Adams may refer to:
Herbert Baxter Adams (1850–1901), American educator and historian
Herbert Adams (carmaker), maker of the Adams-Farwell automobile 1893–1912
Herbert Adams (novelist) (1874–1958), English writer
Herbert Adams (sculptor) (1858–1945), American sculptor
Herbert Jordan Adams (1838–1912), English entomologist
Herb Adams (baseball) (1928–2012), American baseball player
Herb Adams (politician) (born c. 1955), American politician and historian in Maine
Herbert C. Adams (1873–1955), British philatelist

See also
Bert Adams (disambiguation)
Adams (surname)